San Cristovo de Cea is a municipality in Ourense in the Galicia region of north-west Spain. It located towards in the north-west of the province.

References  

Municipalities in the Province of Ourense